Roman Burkard (born 27 April 1940) is a Swiss sports shooter. He competed in the men's 50 metre free pistol event at the 1976 Summer Olympics.

References

1940 births
Living people
Swiss male sport shooters
Olympic shooters of Switzerland
Shooters at the 1976 Summer Olympics
Place of birth missing (living people)